Book (stylized as BOOK) is the 23rd studio album by New York City-based alternative rock band They Might Be Giants, released on November 12, 2021. It was released as a digital download, a compact disc, a vinyl record, a cassette tape, an 8-track tape, and a hardcover book plus CD.

The album was announced in July 2020. It was released along with a 144-page book which features lyrics from 14 of the 15 songs from the album, as well as songs from the accompanying "The Pamphlet" EP and other recent They Might Be Giants albums. The lyrics appear in the form of shape poems with accompanying photos.

Book was nominated for a Grammy award for Best Boxed or Special Limited Edition Package.

Critical reception

On AllMusic Heather Phares wrote, "Comprising an album and a 144-page collection of photos by Brian Karlsson and lyrics expressively rendered by a 1970s IBM Selectric typewriter, Book is an audiovisual celebration of the band's enduring strengths... Consistently entertaining with a few flashes of brilliance, Book kicks off the band's fifth decade of music-making with substance and style."

On PopMatters Chris Conaton said, "After 40 years and 20-plus albums that span many, many genres but are almost always filled with big hooks and endearing bizarreness, They Might Be Giants are as energetic and interesting as ever. The fact that they've always had an absurdist bent and an experimental side essentially lets them do whatever they want.... [Book is] a thoroughly enjoyable record from start to finish."

In Glide Magazine Shawn Donohue wrote, "The album is accompanied by a 144-page full-color, cloth-bound hardcover which features original work by Brooklyn photographer Brian Karlsson and lyrics selected from several TMBG albums set in typographical illustrations by graphic designer Paul Sahre.... On Book (the record) They Might Be Giants continue to pump out what they always have, smart earworm pop tunes that are slightly odd, tastefully corny and instantly catchy."

Track listing

Personnel
They Might Be Giants
 John Flansburgh – vocals, guitars, programming, etc.
 John Linnell – vocals, keyboards, woodwinds, etc.
Additional musicians
 Dan Miller – guitar
 Danny Weinkauf – bass
 Marty Beller – drums, percussion
 Curt Ramm – trumpet
 Dan Levine – trombone, bass trombone
 Stan Harrison – baritone saxophone, flute
Production
 Produced by Patrick Dillett and They Might Be Giants
 Mixing: Patrick Dillett, Thom Beemer
 Engineering: James Yost, Thom Beemer, Matthew Sullivan
 Mastering: UE Nastasi
 Art direction: Paul Sahre
 Photography: Brian Karlsson

Charts

References

2021 albums
Idlewild Recordings albums
They Might Be Giants albums
Albums produced by Pat Dillett